Jochen Küpper FRSC (born 1971) is a German chemist and physicist, group leader at the Center for Free-Electron Laser Science, Deutsches Elektronen-Synchrotron DESY, and Professor of Physics and Professor by courtesy of Chemistry at the University of Hamburg, Germany.

Küpper is best known for his pioneering work on the control of complex neutral molecules, including the spatial separation of structural isomers and their laser-alignment and mixed-field orientation. He develops novel techniques to control the external and internal degrees of freedom of neutral molecules and exploits these well-defined samples in experiments to image their nuclear and electronic structure and dynamics.

Education and career
Jochen Küpper went to Lise-Meitner-Gymnasium in Leverkusen, Germany. From 1991 to 1996 he studied Chemistry at Heinrich Heine University, Düsseldorf, Germany and at University of Pittsburgh, Pittsburgh, PA. In 2000 he received his doctorate in Physical Chemistry from Heinrich Heine University, Düsseldorf, Germany. In 2009 he received the Habilitation in Experimental Physics for his work on the control of large, neutral molecules at Free University Berlin.

He was Feodor-Lynen Fellow of the Alexander von Humboldt Society at the University of North Carolina at Chapel Hill, NC, USA from 2001 to 2002 and at the FOM-Institute for Plasma Physics "Rijnhuizen" in Nieuwegein, The Netherlands. He then became project leader in the Department of Molecular Physics at the Fritz Haber Institute of the Max Planck Society in Berlin-Dahlem, Germany.

Since 2010 he is a Professor of Physics at University of Hamburg and a research group leader at the Center for Free-Electron Laser Science and DESY, Hamburg, Germany and since 2015 he is a Professor by courtesy of Chemistry at the University of Hamburg, Germany.

Honors and awards
Jochen Küpper received several awards, including the prestigious Nernst Haber Bodenstein Prize of the German Bunsen-Society for Physical Chemistry< in 2009 and an ERC Consolidator Grant in 2013. He was elected as Fellow of the Royal Society of Chemistry in 2014. He was awarded the following prizes throughout the years,
 Kandarpa Narahari Rao Prize (2000)
 Feodor Lynen Fellowship of the Alexander von Humboldt Foundation (2001)
 Nernst Haber Bodenstein Prize of the German Bunsen-Society for Physical Chemistry (2009)

Works
 
 
 
 
 
 
 
He has authored more than 120 scientific articles; see also full publication list.

References

External links
 Controlled Molecule Imaging group
 Center for Free-Electron Laser Science
 Department of Physics, University of Hamburg, Germany
 Deutsches Elektronen-Synchrotron DESY
 

Academic staff of the University of Hamburg
21st-century German physicists
Living people
Fellows of the Royal Society of Chemistry
1971 births
People from Leverkusen
Free University of Berlin alumni
German physical chemists
University of Pittsburgh alumni
University of North Carolina at Chapel Hill alumni